Domenico Maria Conti  or Conti Bazzani (or Bazzano/Bozani) (Mantua, 1740 - Rome, February 19, 1815) was an Italian painter, bridging Rococo and Neoclassical styles. He is described as a disciple, and adoptive son of Giuseppe Bazzani, who was director of the Academy of Mantua after 1767.

History
He studied in the Academy of Mantua under Bazzani, and was awarded gold medals in competitions in 1765 and 1766. In 1769, his essay on a young Scipio Africanus was also awarded gold medals, but he did not accept a title of master, but a position teaching figure painting. Among his works in Mantua, he painted in the Royal Palace and in the church of San Zenone. The Jesus Nazarene in the Cathedral was painted during his stay in Rome.

In 1770, Conti moved to Rome, where he found papal patronage, trained with Pompeo Batoni, and was able to establish an active studio. Among his pupils were Giuseppe Tominz and Giuseppe Bossi.  It is reputed that Vincenzo Camuccini and Pietro Benvenuti also frequented his studio. He completed some portraits. He is known in later years for serving as a merchant or appraiser for the exportation of paintings from Rome.

References

18th-century Italian painters
Italian male painters
19th-century Italian painters
Painters from Mantua
1740 births
1817 deaths
19th-century Italian male artists
18th-century Italian male artists